Blackwelder Glacier is a pocket glacier,  wide and  long, between Salmon Hill and Hobbs Glacier in Victoria Land. The glacier was studied during U.S. Navy Operation Deepfreeze, 1957–58, by Troy L. Pewe and was named by him for Eliot Blackwelder, former head of the Geology Department at Stanford University.

References 

Glaciers of Scott Coast